Tun Syed Zahiruddin bin Syed Hassan (11 October 1918 – 20 April 2013) was a Malaysian politician. He was the Yang di-Pertua Negeri of Malacca from 1975 to 1984 and the Ambassador to Ireland in 1975 and the United Kingdom in 1974. He was also the Orang Besar Empat Perak. SMK Tun Syed Zahiruddin also named after him.

Death
Zahiruddin died on 20 April 2013 of a kidney failure, aged 95 and was buried at Bukit Kiara Muslim Cemetery in Kuala Lumpur.

Awards and recognitions

Honours of Malaysia
  : 
 Companion of the Order of the Defender of the Realm (JMN) (1965)
 Malaysian Commemorative Medal (Sliver) (PPM) (1965)
 Commander of the Order of Loyalty to the Crown of Malaysia (PSM) – Tan Sri (1968)
 Grand Commander of the Order of the Defender of the Realm (SMN) – Tun (1976)
 :
  Knight Commander of the Order of the Perak State Crown (DPMP) – Dato' (1964)
  Knight Grand Commander of the Order of the Perak State Crown (SPMP) – Dato' Seri (1975)
 Grand Knight of the Order of Cura Si Manja Kini (SPCM) – Dato' Seri (1987)
 Ordinary Class of the Perak Family Order of Sultan Azlan Shah (SPSA) – Dato’ Seri Diraja (2005)
 Grand Knight of the Azlanii Royal Family Order (DSA) – Dato' Seri (2009)

Places named after him
Several places were named after him, including:
 Tun Syed Zahiruddin Residential College, a residential college at University of Malaya, Kuala Lumpur
 SMK Tun Syed Zahiruddin, a secondary school in Merlimau, Malacca

References

1918 births
2013 deaths
Malaysian people of Malay descent
Malaysian Muslims
United Malays National Organisation politicians
Yang di-Pertua Negeri of Malacca
Companions of the Order of the Defender of the Realm
Commanders of the Order of Loyalty to the Crown of Malaysia
Grand Commanders of the Order of the Defender of the Realm
High Commissioners of Malaysia to the United Kingdom